Badruddin bin Amiruldin (born 20 May 1951) is a Malaysian politician. He is currently the Permanent Chairman of the United Malays National Organisation (UMNO), the largest Malay political party in the country and the leader of the Barisan Nasional (BN) coalition. Badruddin was also, until his defeat in the March 2008 General Elections, the Member of Parliament for the constituency of Jerai, Kedah in the lower house of Parliament, the Dewan Rakyat.

Early political life
Badruddin was not a very well known politician in the early 1990s and started as a backbencher in Parliament, when he made his electoral debut in the 1992 Jerai by-election and get elected the first time as the Member of Parliament for the constituency of Jerai before it was abolished in 1995. Badruddin then contested and won the constituency of Yan, Kedah in the 1995 general election but he was defeated in the 1999 general election to Nasharudin bin Mat Isa from (PAS), losing by 182 votes.

Rise to prominence
In the 2004 general election, Badruddin ran for the new re-created Jerai constituency and managed to elected to represent the seat again for second time under the UMNO ticket. He defeated his opponent, Che Din bin Arshad from PAS, with a majority of 10,405. Later that same year, he was elected as the Deputy Permanent Chairman of UMNO with 1,510 delegates voting for him.

Electoral defeat in 2008
In the 12th general election on 8 March 2008, Badruddin failed to retain his Jerai seat and lost to a newcomer from PAS, Mohd Firdaus Jaafar by a majority of 2,299 votes.

Election results

Honours

Honours of Malaysia
  :
  Commander of the Order of Loyalty to the Crown of Malaysia (PSM) – Tan Sri (2012)
  :
  Knight Companion of the Order of Loyalty to the Royal House of Kedah (DSDK) – Dato' (1997)
  Knight Commander of the Order of Loyalty to Sultan Abdul Halim Mu'adzam Shah (DHMS) – Dato' Paduka (2004)

References
 "Badruddin should not use term 'keling'". Retrieved 18 November 2005.
 Beh, Lih Yi (11 July 2005). "Drama in the Dewan Rakyat". Malaysiakini.
 Beh, Lih Yi (17 October 2005). "Badruddin calls Kit Siang an 'Ah Pek'". Malaysiakini.
 "Choice to wear Tudung left to individual: Nazri". (30 October 2005). Daily Express.
 "Don't Forget Your Roots, Malay Corporate Citizens Told". (24 September 2004). BERNAMA.
 "Don’t like the term Islamic state? Take a hike, says BN MP". (13 July 2005). Malaysiakini.
 "Election 1999 results - state Kedah". (1999). BERNAMA.
 "Election 2004 results - state Kedah". (2004). BERNAMA.
 Fernandez, Terence (9 November 2005). "YB, Parliament is not a 'Kedai runcit'". The Sun.
 Gatsiounis, Ioannis (2 October 2004). "Abdullah stirs a hornets' nest". Asia Times.
 "Keputusan Penuh Pemilihan". (2004). Berita Harian.
 Lim, Kit Siang (2004). "UMNO - don't create new 'seditious' issues". Retrieved 9 November 2004.
 Ram, B. Suresh (1 April 2005). "Cili Padi hot over sexist remark". The Sun.
 Reme Ahmad (22 March 2006). "Two MPs call S'pore 'insolent'". Straits Times.
 "Third report lodged against Badruddin". (31 October 2005). The Star.
 Vasudevan, V. (27 October). "Across the Floor: Bid to discipline MP shot down". Malay Mail.
 Wong, Chun Wai (18 April 2005). "Jester performance of MPs not amusing". The Star.
 Badruddin says sorry to Karpal The Star 30 October 2007. Retrieved 13 December 2007

Specific

1951 births
Malaysian people of Acehnese descent
People from Kedah
Living people
United Malays National Organisation politicians
Malaysian people of Malay descent
Members of the Dewan Rakyat
Speakers of the Kedah State Legislative Assembly
Commanders of the Order of Loyalty to the Crown of Malaysia